Francis Beckett (born 12 May 1945) is an English author, journalist, biographer, and contemporary historian. He has written biographies of Aneurin Bevan, Clement Attlee, Harold Macmillan, Gordon Brown and Tony Blair. He has also written on education for the New Statesman, The Guardian and The Independent and is the editor of Third Age Matters, the national magazine published by the University of the Third Age. Beckett has been described as "an Old Labour romantic" by Guardian associate editor Michael White.

Early life
Francis Beckett was born in 1945 in Chenies, Buckinghamshire, 21 miles from the centre of London, because his father, John Beckett, just released from wartime internment because of his fascist past, was under a form of house arrest, unable to live within 20 miles of the capital or to travel more than five miles away from his home.

His mother, Anne Cutmore, was the long-term life partner of John Beckett; Cutmore and Beckett finally married in 1963 after Beckett's second wife, Kyrle Bellew, granted him a divorce after 18 years of separation.

He was moved from school to school and home to home as his parents' fragile finances ebbed and flowed, eventually spending four years at Beaumont College, a Jesuit boarding school near Windsor, Berkshire, where he claims to have been "force-fed a diet of beating, bullying and religious bigotry.”

He took A-levels at a London further education college and studied history and philosophy at Keele University. There he was chosen by the English-Speaking Union to be one of the two British student debaters to tour the US in 1969.

Career
He worked as a journalist, a teacher, an adult education lecturer, and West Midlands organiser for the Housing charity Shelter, before becoming head of the press and publications department at the National Union of Students. He left to take a similar job in a trade union, was elected president of the National Union of Journalists in 1980, and worked as a Labour Party press officer during 1983–84. In 1983 he worked for the unsuccessful Labour Party deputy leadership campaign of John Silkin.

Since 1984 he has been a freelance writer. He has written regularly on education for The Guardian and The Independent for 15 years and was education correspondent of the New Statesman for seven. He has also written on politics, industrial relations, business and management, and the theatre, and edited two management publications. His New Statesman articles provided the main left wing critique of New Labour's education policies, and more recently, he has been a leading critic of city academies, putting the argument against in various newspapers and writing his book The Great City Academy Fraud.

Beckett has written a biography of his own father, John, a Labour MP from 1925 to 1931 and whip of the Independent Labour Party group of MPs; later chief propagandist for Oswald Mosley's British Union of Fascists and co-founder (with William Joyce) of the National Socialist League, who was interned during the second world war for his fascist activities. He returned to the subject of his own background with Fascist in the Family (2016) which Martin Bright in The Jewish Chronicle described as "part political history, part memoir: an attempt to come to terms with the horror of growing up with a fascist as a father".

He wrote a biography of Clement Attlee. His biography of Tony Blair, written with The Guardians Westminster Correspondent David Hencke, is hostile and damaging, and his 2009 book, Marching to the Fault Line, also written with David Hencke, is according to Seumas Milne, "the first attempt since its immediate aftermath to offer a full account of the [miners'] strike." It is, according to Neil Kinnock, "full of vital insights and written with a sense of pace that does justice to the tragic drama."  He was general editor of the series of 20 books, Prime Ministers of the Twentieth Century. He has written biographies of four prime ministers – Attlee, Macmillan, Blair and Brown – but his biography of Attlee is the most substantial, considered by Roy Jenkins – Attlee's first biographer – to be a landmark work, defining Attlee for a new generation.  "Beckett gets near to the essence of Attlee, and does so in an easy, flowing narrative" wrote Jenkins.

Beckett's work gains strong reactions from across the political spectrum. His co-authored 2004 biography of Tony Blair was considered far too hostile by Roy Hattersley, but his portrayal of Arthur Scargill in his co-authored book on the 1984-85 miners' strike led Andrew Murray, in the Morning Star to advise readers not to "feed the jackals". In response, with co-author David Hencke, Beckett insisted that the writers were not jackals but lifelong trade unionists, and asserted that "...for Murray to try to make out that you are doing something bad by buying or reading our book is not just censorship, but also the bitterest form of ideological rigidity and sectarianism".

In 2010 What Did the Baby Boomers Ever Do For Us? was published by Biteback. The book claims that the baby boomer generation inherited the good years, and pulled the ladder up after them. Blair Inc: The Man Behind The Mask, co-written with David Hencke and Nick Kochan, was published in March 2015.

Beckett's plays are published by Samuel French, having been performed on the London fringe or on radio, and his short stories appear in the Young Oxford series published by Oxford University Press. He is editor of the national magazine published by the University of the Third Age.

Books
Biographies
The Rebel Who Lost His Cause: The Tragedy of John Beckett MP, Allison and Busby, 1999
Nye Bevan, (co-author Clare Beckett), Haus Publishing, 2004
The Blairs and Their Court (co-author David Hencke), Aurum Press, 2004 (revised and enlarged in paperback as The Survivor: Tony Blair in Peace and War, Aurum Press, 2005)
Gordon Brown, Haus Publishing, June 2007
Clem Attlee, Politicos, re-issued March 2007
Laurence Olivier, Haus Publishing, 2005
Harold Macmillan, Haus Publishing, 2006
Blair Inc: The Money, The Scandals, The Power, John Blake Publishing Ltd., 2015
Fascist in the Family: The Tragedy of John Beckett MP, Routledge, 2016

Contemporary history
Enemy Within – The Rise and Fall of British Communism, John Murray (hb), 1995; Merlin Press (pb), 1998
Stalin's British Victims, Sutton Publishing, 2004
Marching to the Fault Line – The Miners’ Strike 1984-5 (co-author David Hencke), Constable and Robinson, 2009
Firefighters and the Blitz, Merlin, 2010
What Did the Baby Boomers Ever Do For Us?, Biteback Publishing, July 2010
1956: The Year That Changed Britain (co-author Tony Russell), Biteback Publishing, 2015
Jeremy Corbyn and the Strange Rebirth of Labour England (co-author Mark Seddon), Biteback Publishing, 2018

Education
The Great City Academy Fraud, Continuum, March 2007
 How To Create a Successful School, Biteback, 2010

Plays
Money makes you Happy, Samuel French, 2008
The Right Honourable Lady, Samuel French, 2009

References

External links
 Official website

1945 births
Living people
Alumni of Keele University
People from Chiltern District
English biographers
English male journalists
English people of Jewish descent
English Roman Catholics
English writers
Trade unionists from Buckinghamshire
Male biographers
Presidents of the National Union of Journalists